A Bachelor Husband is a 1920 British silent romance film directed by Kenelm Foss and starring Lyn Harding, Renee Mayer and Hayford Hobbs. It was based on a story by Ruby M. Ayres, originally published in the Daily Mirror.

Plot
Inheritor weds stepsister who elopes with cad.

Cast
 Lyn Harding as Feather Dakers  
 Renée Mayer as Marie Celeste  
 Hayford Hobbs as Chris Lawless  
 Irene Rooke as Aunt Madge 
 Lionelle Howard as Atkins  
 Gordon Craig as Chris, as a child  
 Margot Drake as Mrs. Chester  
 Will Corrie as George Chester  
 R. Heaton Grey as Aston Knight  
 Phyllis Joyce as Mrs. Heriot

References

Bibliography
 Low, Rachael. History of the British Film, 1918-1929. George Allen & Unwin, 1971.

External links

1920 films
1920 romantic drama films
British silent feature films
British romantic drama films
Films directed by Kenelm Foss
Films set in England
British black-and-white films
1920s English-language films
1920s British films
Silent romantic drama films